Rudolph Malcolm Walker  (born 28 September 1939) is a Trinidadian-British actor, best known for his sitcom roles as  Bill Reynolds in Love Thy Neighbour (1972–76), Constable Frank Gladstone in The Thin Blue Line (1995–96) and since 2001, he has played Patrick Trueman in the BBC soap opera EastEnders.

Early life and emigration
Rudolph Walker was born on 28 September 1939 in San Juan, Trinidad and Tobago. He began acting as an eight-year-old in primary school, going on to join Derek Walcott's Trinidad Theatre Workshop as its youngest member. With the aim of furthering his career he left the island at the age of 20 in 1960. He had been planning to go to the United States, where he had connections, but actor Errol John — who had already migrated to Britain but was in Trinidad doing a play — convinced him to go to the UK, where the training was considered to be superior.

Walker was married to Lorna Ross in 1968, but they divorced after having two children. He then married fellow Trinidadian Dounne Alexander in 1998. This union later ended, and in 2016, he married Evangeline Vincent.

Career
Walker's earliest television role was as a policeman in the British The Wednesday Play, in the episode titled "Fable" (aired 27 January 1965). He is known for his comedic roles in Love Thy Neighbour (Thames Television), The Thin Blue Line, which starred Rowan Atkinson, and in Ali G Indahouse. Walker also appeared in Doctor Who, in the 1969 serial The War Games, and also in several episodes of Empire Road in 1979. He was one of the first black actors to be seen regularly on British television, and so has always been proud of his role on the controversial Love Thy Neighbour, which ran for seven series, from 1972 to 1976.

He appeared in the first episode of the ITV sitcom ⋅On the Buses, "The Early Shift" (1969), and the first episode of Mr. Bean as "The Examiner" (1990). His other notable roles included as barrister Larry Scott in the 1985 BBC series Black Silk, by Mustapha Matura and Rudy Narayan. 

Since 2001, Walker has played Patrick Trueman in the BBC One television soap opera EastEnders, for which role he was voted best actor in 2002 at the annual Ethnic Multicultural Media Awards, and in 2010 he appeared in the Internet spin-off series EastEnders: E20. He also starred in a BBC One sitcom called The Crouches, about a family from Walworth, in South-East London. He played the grandfather for both series (2003–2005).

Although much of his work has been on television, he has appeared in several movies, including 10 Rillington Place, King Ralph (along with his Love Thy Neighbour co star, Jack Smethurst), and Let Him Have It. On the stage, Walker appeared in the first production of Mustapha Matura's Play Mas at the Royal Court Theatre in 1974, and has played the titular character in stage productions of Shakespeare's Othello, directed by David Thacker and Charles Marowitz, and also Caliban in a production of The Tempest directed by Jonathan Miller. Walker was also Gower in Thacker's 1989 production of Pericles, Prince of Tyre.

He also played opposite Diane Parish in Lovejoy (starring Ian McShane) where they played Father and Daughter.

Walker also lent his voice to the British children's television series Teletubbies, in which he renarrated the opening and closing sequences for the American dubbed version and voiced some of the voice trumpets for both the British and American versions.

He was the subject of This Is Your Life in 1999, when he was surprised by Michael Aspel on his 60th birthday at Lord's cricket ground.

A biography for children about Walker, written by Verna Wilkins, was published by Tamarind Books on 4 September 2008.

In 2018, he was awarded the Outstanding Achievement Award at the British Soap Awards.

Honours
Walker was appointed Officer of the Order of the British Empire (OBE) in the 2006 Birthday Honours for services to drama and Commander of the Order of the British Empire (CBE) in the 2020 New Year Honours for services to drama and charity.

The Rudolph Walker Foundation
On Walker's 70th birthday, he launched The Rudolph Walker Foundation, whose aims include helping to provide opportunities and incentives for disadvantaged youths starting out on an entertainment career. The Foundation administers Rudolph Walker's inter-School Drama Award (RWiSDA), competed for by schools across London. In addition, Rudolph Walker's Role Model Award (RWRMA) is presented to outstanding students who have contributed something special, such as demonstrating positive leadership, a good influence to their peers and others, and a role model within the school.

Filmography

Film

Television

Awards and nominations

References

External links

Credits at Gavin Barker Associates website
RWiSDA website
"Rudolph Walker – The Interview", YouTube video.

1939 births
Living people
20th-century British male actors
20th-century Trinidad and Tobago male actors
21st-century British male actors
Black British male actors
Black British male comedians
British male comedy actors
British male film actors
British male soap opera actors
British male voice actors
Commanders of the Order of the British Empire
Naturalised citizens of the United Kingdom
Trinidad and Tobago emigrants to the United Kingdom
Trinidad and Tobago male film actors
Trinidad and Tobago male stage actors
Trinidad and Tobago male television actors
20th-century Trinidad and Tobago actors